"Way Back" is a song by American girl group TLC, featuring Snoop Dogg, from their fifth studio album, TLC (2017). An ode to the group's fanbase since their beginnings in 1991, it was released as the lead single on April 14, 2017, by newly formed label 852 Musiq and UK-based independent record company Cooking Vinyl. The song was written by group member Tionne Watkins and James Abrahart alongside Snoop Dogg and was produced by D'Mile, who also wrote the middle-8 section on the extended version.

Background and promotion
On April 12, 2017, TLC announced on Twitter, "Tune into @BBNcrew tomorrow @ 12PM EST to get the first listen of our new single, Way Back. Can't wait to share it with you! #TLCgoeswayback". "Way Back" premiered on April 13 via the Internet radio service iHeartRadio.

Critical reception
Billboard described the song as having a "G-funk, R&B groove". Time stated in an article, "The pair gifted us an extra-special throwback bop for the weekend in the form of the brand-new track "Way Back," a smooth, groovy tune that marks their first release in a whopping 15 years."

Music video
TLC went on Big Boys Neighborhood to promote the single and announced a contest that would allow a few lucky fans to be extras in the video. The lucky fans were selected on April 19, 2017 via Facebook and given specific instructions for the following morning.

The music video was shot in North Hollywood, California on April 20, 2017 from 7:00AM to 10:00PM. The fans that were selected are all featured as back up dancers in the dance scene around the blue convertible car during the chorus. The video uses the extended version of the song.

The video was released on June 6, 2017 and was met with positive reviews and gained 2 million views on YouTube in 48 hours.

Track listing

Commercial performance
In the United States, "Way Back" debuted at number thirty-three on the Billboard Twitter Top Tracks chart on April 29, 2017. The song also debuted at number twenty-eight on the Adult R&B Songs chart on May 6, 2017. In its second week the song charted at number twenty-three. In its third and fourth week the song charted at numbers nineteen and fifteen respectively. In its fifth week the song rose one place, charting at number fourteen. The song entered the Top 10 in its eleventh week.

Charts

Weekly charts

Year-end charts

Release history

References

2017 songs
2017 singles
Cooking Vinyl singles
Funk songs
TLC (group) songs
Songs written by Tionne Watkins
Songs written by James Abrahart